Sugar Cane Growers Cooperative of Florida is a vertically integrated agricultural enterprise that harvests, transports and processes sugarcane grown primarily in Palm Beach County, Florida and markets the raw sugar and blackstrap molasses through the Florida Sugar and Molasses Exchange.  The Cooperative is made up of 45 grower-owners who produce sugarcane on approximately 70,000 acres of some of the most fertile farmland in America, located in the Everglades Agricultural Area (EAA).  Sugarcane grown by Cooperative members is harvested, transported and processed. The raw sugar is then marketed to one of the ASR Group's sugar refineries.  The Cooperative produces more than 350,000 tons of raw sugar annually.

History 
The history of the Sugar Cane Growers Cooperative of Florida dates back to the 1950s when 16 farmers met to discuss joining together with other farmers in the region known as the Glades Area, which is west of West Palm Beach, Florida, and southeast of Lake Okeechobee, to form a farming cooperative. The group's goal was to provide a means to harvest, mill, process, and market sugar and its by-products from a collective crop of sugarcane to bring stability to the growers operations.  In July 1960, 54 farmer-members chartered Sugar Cane Growers Cooperative of Florida.  In the years since then, the Cooperative has grown in scale and scope and is now a vertically integrated operation involved in the farming, processing, marketing, refining and distribution of cane sugar.

Collectively, the farmers of the Cooperative have all of the resources, technical and regulatory support, marketing and legal resources, usually afforded to only the largest farming operations. The Cooperative makes it possible for these family farmers to stay abreast of the most recent technological advancements in science to protect and preserve the environment and provide economic stability and viability in an increasingly complex global business.

In 2005, California and Hawaiian Sugar Company was acquired by American Sugar Refining (ASR, better known as Domino Sugar), a company owned by Florida Crystals and the Sugar Cane Growers Cooperative of Florida. Florida Crystals is a privately held company that is part of FLO-SUN, a sugar empire of the Fanjul family whose origins trace to Spanish-Cuban sugar plantations of the early 19th century.

Glades Sugar House 
Once formed, the Cooperative's immediate need was to build a state-of-the-art processing facility and agricultural equipment to harvest the sugar cane grown by its members.  The member-growers were assessed 30 cents per ton produced in 1960 to pay for the feasibility study to build their own sugar mill.  In April 1961, the decision was made to build the mill, named Glades Sugar House.

The mill opened on November 22, 1962, with the capacity to grind 6,000 tons of sugarcane per day. Today, Glades Sugar House is one of the largest raw sugar mills in the world with the capacity to grind 26,000 tons of sugarcane per day.  It operates 24-hours a day through the 150-day harvest season. The mill grinds approximately 3 million tons of sugarcane each annual harvest, producing more than a half-billion pounds of raw sugar per year.

Glades Sugar House is a modern manufacturing facility, and also the center of the Cooperative's operations. As such, it symbolizes of the benefits of small and medium-sized farms coming together to achieve economies of scale that allow them to compete as a major player in an important commodities market.

Governance 
The Cooperative's 45 members elect a Board of Directors to guide its policy and operations. Since its inception, each member is treated equally, with each member having one vote. Equal voice in Cooperative business keeps the organization unified and thriving in a competitive marketplace.

George H. Wedgworth

George H. Wedgworth  founded the Cooperative, and until his retirement in October 2013, served as Chairman of the Board. He led the Cooperative for 53 years and played a significant role in Florida agriculture, and Glades-area civic activities. Wedgworth was induction into Florida's Agricultural Hall of Fame, and named Community Leader of the Year by the Chamber of Commerce of the Palm Beaches.

Environmental Stewardship 

The farmer members of Sugar Cane Growers Cooperative stay abreast of technological advancements in order to maintain efficient farming operations. The Everglades Agricultural Area (EAA) is characterized by rich organic soil, flat topography, abundant rainfall, and solar period making it a favorable place to farm. However, the EAA is geographically located in the midst of the Greater Everglades ecosystem, which has been severely damaged by the environmental modifications made to allow commercial agriculture. In addition to the direct loss of native wildlife habitat through the draining of former wetlands, the continued overuse of agricultural fertilizers has led to the widespread loss of native plants and wildlife. Working collaboratively with University of Florida scientists, farmers have pioneered Best Management Practices (BMPs) to reduce nutrients leaving the farming region, but environmental advocates say that too much phosphorus still makes its way into environmentally sensitive estuarian ecosystems such as the St. Lucie River and Indian River Lagoon.

As part of the landmark "Everglades Forever Act" approved by the Florida Legislature in 1994, farmers in the Everglades Agricultural Area are required to achieve 25 percent reduction in phosphorus in waters flowing off of farmland.  Additionally, the Act provided for the construction of 40,000 acres of natural filter marshes that further reduce phosphorus in water flowing from farms, urbanized areas and Lake Okeechobee.  The Act also imposed a regulatory framework that imposes a $25 per acre tax along with comprehensive water quality monitoring and reporting requirements.

Farmers have exceeded the strict phosphorus reduction requirements during each of the 16 years since the law took effect. However, Audubon of Florida argues this reduction standard was intentionally set too low, making it easier for the sugar industry and other growers to meet the annual requirement.

Sugarcane 
Sugarcane is a tropical grass native to Asia. Four species have been interbred to produce the sugarcane grown commercially by the Cooperative, which is from the genus Saccharum. It grows as high as 20 feet tall and about two inches in diameter. As a plant, sugarcane is one of the most efficient at converting carbon dioxide in sunlight and storing carbohydrate energy through photosynthesis.

All green plants produce sugar (sucrose), but none as effectively as sugarcane. Water in the leaves and photosynthesis enable the plant to convert carbon dioxide from the air and radiation from the sun along with chlorophyll into sugar, which is stored in the stalk of the plant.

Palm Beach County, Florida, home of the Cooperative, accounts for approximately 75 percent of the commercial sugarcane acreage in Florida and 75 percent of the total harvested sugarcane tonnage in Florida. Rich, organic soil, abundant water and sunshine, and the warming influence of Lake Okeechobee are the primary reason sugarcane farmers are located in the area. In 2010, the state's raw sugar crop was valued at more than $2 billion in economic activity making it one of Florida's top five most economically valuable field crops.

Sugar 

Sugar from sugarcane is natural and has been grown by farmers for hundreds of years; it is a natural and environmentally gentle crop. Sugar balances flavor, preserves foods and provides the necessary moisture to keep foods fresh. In its refined state, sugar is a pure commercially produced organic substance, containing more than 99.9 percent sucrose. For this reason, the U.S. Food and Drug Administration has determined sugar to be a "safe food" because it is all natural and free of any synthetic chemicals, preservatives, or additives.

In 1512, when Ponce de León landed in St. Augustine, he brought the first sugarcane to Florida. This agricultural introduction was so important that the area south of St. Augustine became known as "Canaveral," the Spanish word for sugarcane field. This area is now known as Cape Canaveral, home to the NASA Space Center.

The crop grew rapidly as growing and processing techniques improved. In 1600, the world's largest industry was the production of raw sugar in tropical America. Sugar became the first commodity, besides precious metals, to be shipped from colonial America to Europe. 

Sugar refining purifies the raw sugar. It is first mixed with heavy syrup and then centrifuged in a process called "affination". Its purpose is to wash away the sugar crystals' outer coating, which is less pure than the crystal interior. The remaining sugar is then dissolved to make a syrup, about 60 percent solids by weight.

The sugar solution is clarified by the addition of phosphoric acid and calcium hydroxide, which combine to precipitate calcium phosphate. The calcium phosphate particles entrap some impurities and absorb others, and then float to the top of the tank, where they can be skimmed off. An alternative to this "phosphatation" technique is "carbonatation", which is similar, but uses carbon dioxide and calcium hydroxide to produce a calcium carbonate precipitate.

After filtering any remaining solids, the clarified syrup is decolorized by filtration through activated carbon. Bone char or coal-based activated carbon is traditionally used in this role. Some remaining color-forming impurities adsorb to the carbon. The purified syrup is then concentrated to supersaturation and repeatedly crystallized in a vacuum, to produce white refined sugar. As in a sugar mill, the sugar crystals are separated from the molasses by centrifuging. Additional sugar is recovered by blending the remaining syrup with the washings from affination and again crystallizing to produce brown sugar. When no more sugar can be economically recovered, the final molasses still contains 20–30 percent sucrose and 15–25 percent glucose and fructose.

To produce granulated sugar, in which individual grains do not clump, sugar must be dried, first by heating in a rotary dryer, and then by blowing cool air through it for several days.

Today, world production of sugar exceeds 120 million tons annually with per capita consumption by Americans of 67 pounds per year. More than half of the United States' supply of cane sugar is produced in Florida.

Molasses 
One of the by-products of sugarcane processing is blackstrap molasses, which is sold primarily as livestock feed. The Cooperative produces 16 million gallons of blackstrap molasses annually. The molasses is then marketed through a non-profit trade association, which was formed in 1969 when the local market could no longer absorb the high quantities of molasses being produced.

Today all raw sugar producers in Florida belong to this association, the Florida Molasses Exchange, Inc., which provides efficient distribution of molasses domestically and abroad.

Growing and Harvesting 
Commercial sugarcane is planted from stalk cuttings and placed in furrows about five feet apart. After approximately 12 months, the mature sugarcane is ready for harvest. Growers average four harvests from a single planting.  Harvesting season lasts from late October through mid-March, approximately 150 days.
The first step in the harvesting process is the highly controlled pre-harvest burning of the cane fields. Each field burn is individually permitted by the State of Florida Division of Forestry. Farmers are allowed to burn only when climatic conditions permit. Burning causes excessive leaves to be removed, preparing the way for the mechanical harvesters and then the processing of the cane. An added benefit to this practice is that it reduces the need for applications of pesticides.
The Cooperative harvests an average of 500 acres per day using combine-style mechanical harvesters. In a typical harvesting unit, three or four harvesters operate in tandem with six to eight tractors and strings of wagons. The harvesters contain rotating knives, which cut through the sugarcane at the base of the stalk. The cane tops are also cut off by rotating knives and excess foliage is removed by giant extraction fans.
As the sugarcane passes through the harvester, it is cut into 12-inch lengths and put into field wagons. The sugarcane is then hauled to a nearby transfer station and loaded onto semi-trailers for delivery to Glades Sugar House for grinding.
Each semi contains about 19-tons of sugarcane. A load arrives at the mill site about every 45 seconds during daylight hours. Approximately 1,200 loads are delivered daily to keep the processing facility at peak capacity during harvest season.
More than 61,000 acres are harvested each season, producing more than 2.4 million tons of sugarcane.
Processing
The Glades Sugar House operates 24-hours a day throughout the 150-day annual harvest. The mill grinds as much as 26,000 tons of sugarcane per day or three million tons each season. One ton of sugarcane produces approximately 220 pounds of raw sugar. 
Experienced operators use technology-based equipment to separate the harvested raw cane into sugar, water, molasses and bagasse (the pulp, rind and fiber of the sugarcane stalk). Every part of the sugarcane stalk is used.
Within 24 hours of harvesting, each load of sugarcane is cut and processed into raw sugar. Along the way the high-tech mill uses all of the plant's by-products. Even the fibrous wood pulp that remains after the sugar cane has been repeatedly pressed, crushed and shredded is not wasted.  This pulp, called bagasse, fuels the mill's boilers, creating steam-generated electricity to power the mill. By using bagasse as a fuel, the Cooperative saves the equivalent of 31 million gallons of fossil fuel each year. The water that makes up 80 percent of the cane stalk is also recycled and re-used within the process. Combined, all of the state's sugar producers save 113 million gallons of fuel oil or 2.1 billion kilowatt hours of electricity each year. 
Processing involves separating the natural sugar juice from the stalk then concentrating the juice to produce raw sugar crystals and blackstrap molasses, which is sold primarily as animal feed. During the 2010-11 harvest season, the Cooperative produced more than 260,000 tons of raw sugar and 16 million gallons of black strap molasses.

Marketing, Refineries, and Brands 
The Cooperative's raw sugar is marketed and shipped through the Florida Sugar and Molasses Exchange located in the Port of Palm Beach, Florida. The raw sugar is sold to American Sugar Refining, Inc., where it is refined to produce white table sugar.

American Sugar Refining has refineries in Yonkers, New York; Baltimore, Maryland; Chalmette, Louisiana; Crockett, California; Toronto, Canada; and Veracruz, Mexico. These refineries market more than 4.25 million tons of refined sugar a year.

American Sugar Refining markets its products through Domino Foods, Inc., a wholly owned Cooperative subsidiary serving five key markets: grocery, food service, industrial, specialty sweetener and export. The products are marketed under the brand names Domino, C&H, Jack Frost, Florida Crystals and numerous private labels.9975606114

Everglades Agricultural Area 
The Everglades Agricultural Area (EAA) is approximately 20 miles west of West Palm Beach, Florida. The region contains one of the largest contiguous areas of rich, black-muck, organic soils in the U.S. The area is home to more than 400,000 acres of sugarcane crops.

The EAA was created by an act of Congress in 1948 at the same time as the Water Conservation Areas were developed as part of the Central and Southern Flood Control project. More than 450,000 acres are home to sugarcane, winter vegetables, sod and rice farms.

Water Management and the Everglades 
As with most of Florida, early settlers had a difficult time developing the interior of Palm Beach County near Lake Okeechobee because the Everglades extended into the region. Beginning in 1847, various projects were undertaken to drain the land and make it usable with varying levels of success. This partial drainage of the Everglades made way for farm settlement between 1910 and 1926. The first commercially grown crops included sugarcane, tomatoes, beans and more.

In 1926, a hurricane struck the Miami and Lake Okeechobee region causing 200 deaths and extensive financial loss. Two years later, another hurricane hit Palm Beach and moved westward toward the lake, which overflowed, drowning approximately 2,400 people near Moore Haven.

From this point on, there have been varying levels of local, state, and federal government oversight in managing the waterways of the Everglades and surrounding agricultural lands.  In 1948, Congress passed the Flood Control Act creating the Central and Southern Florida Control Project, a multi-faceted project providing flood control; water supply for municipal, industrial, and agricultural uses; prevention of salt water intrusion; water supply for Everglades National Park; and the protection of wildlife. The system comprises 1,000 miles of levees, 720 miles of canals, and nearly 200 water control structures. The Everglades Agricultural Area also was designated via this Act.

In 1994, Governor Lawton Chiles introduced the Everglades Forever Act as a means to improve the quality of water flowing into the Everglades.

In 2000, the Comprehensive Everglades Restoration Plan, or CERP, was introduced with the objective of restoring, preserving and protecting the South Florida ecosystem while providing for the region's water needs.

In 2004, under the direction of Governor Jeb Bush, the State of Florida purchased 12,000 acres in Martin County to fast-track the Everglades restoration. This program was known as Acceler8.

See also
American Sugar Refining Company 
California and Hawaiian Sugar Company
Fanjul brothers
Sugar Cane

References

Further reading

External links

Homepage of Florida Crystals Corporation
Sugar Cane Growers Cooperative of Florida

Sugar companies of the United States
Agricultural cooperatives in the United States
Agriculture in Florida
Organizations based in Florida